The following is a timeline of the history of the city of Bucharest, Romania.

Before the 17th century

 1459 – Bucharest chartered by Drăculeşti Vlad III, Prince of Wallachia.
 1559 – Old Court Church built by Mircea Ciobanul
 1587 – Mărcuța Church built.
 1589 - Lipscani (street) completed.
 1595 - Burned by the Turks.

17th century
 1633 – Bucharest Bărăția (church) built.
 1658 – Metropolitan Church consecrated.
 1667 – Slobozia Church built.
 1688 – Romanian-language Bucharest Bible published.
 1692 – Podul Mogoșoaiei paved with wood.
 1694 – Princely Academy of Bucharest founded.
 1698 – Constantin Brâncoveanu, Prince of Wallachia changed the capital from Târgoviște to Bucharest.

18th century
 1702 – Mogoşoaia Palace built near city.
 1715 – Antim Monastery built.
 1722 – Kretzulescu Church built.
 1724 – Stavropoleos Church built.
 1739 – Gabroveni Inn built.
 1757 – Lutheran church established.
 1769 – City taken by Russians.
 1789 – City taken by Austrians.
 1793 - Plague & Earthquiake.

19th century
 1808 – Manuc's Inn built.
 1812 – 28 May: City hosts signing of the Treaty of Bucharest (1812).
 1813 – Plague.
 1821 – Greek uprising.
 1828 – City taken by Russians who handed it to the prince of Walachia in 1829.
 1847
 Great Fire of Bucharest.
 Cișmigiu Gardens inaugurated.
 1848
 September: City occupied by Turkish forces.
 October: City occupied by Russian forces.
 1852
 Grand Theatre inaugurated.
 Casa Capșa confectionery in business.
 1853
 July: City temporarily occupied by Russians.
 8 August: Turks in power.
 6 September: Austrians in power.
 1856 – Austrian occupation ends.
 1857 – Street lighting installed.
 1858 – Bellu cemetery in use.
 1861 – City becomes capital of Romania.
 1862 – Orphanage founded.
 1863 – Music and Drama Conservatory established.
 1864
 University of Bucharest, Bucharest National University of Arts, School of Bridges and Roads, Mines and Architecture, and National Museum of Antiquities founded.
 Barbu Vlădoianu becomes mayor.
 1865 – Flooding of Bucharest
 1866
 Romanian Academy founded.
 Alexandru Ioan Cuza, first ruler of the Romanian Principalities, driven from his throne by an insurrection in Bucharest.
 1867
 Templul Coral (synagogue) built.
 Population: 141,754.
 1871 – Societatea Română de Tramvaiuri (tram society) established.
 1872 – Gara Târgoviștei (railway station) built.
 1880 – Bukarester Tagblatt German-language newspaper begins publication.
 1881 - City becomes capital of Kingdom of Romania
 1883
 Roman Catholic Archdiocese of Bucharest established.
 Saint Joseph Cathedral completed.
 Orient Express (Paris-Bucharest) begins operating.
 1884 – Doamna Balasa church built.
 1886
 Romanian Philharmonic Society founded.
 Capșa Hotel in business.
 City hosts signing of the Treaty of Bucharest (1886).

 1888
 Romanian Athenaeum built.
 Pache Protopopescu becomes mayor.
 Piața Rosetti laid out.
 1890 – League for the Cultural Unity of All Romanians founded.
 1891 – Bucharest Botanical Garden opens.
 1894
 Electric tram begins operating.
 Central School for Girls built.
 1895 – Central University Library of Bucharest established.
 1900
 House of Savings built.
 Population: 282,071.

20th century

 1906 – Bucharest Jubilee Exhibition held.
 1909
 Bucharest Russian Church built.
 Saint Basil the Great Cathedral opened.
 1912 – Military Circle built.
 1913 – City hosts signing of the Treaty of Bucharest (1913).
 1914 – Anglican Church (Bucharest) built.
 1916
 6 December: German occupation of city begins.
 August: City hosts signing of the Treaty of Bucharest (1916).
 1918
 German occupation of city ends.
 May: City hosts signing of the Treaty of Bucharest (1918).
 December: Typographers' strike is violently suppressed
 1925 – Dramă şi Comedie (theatre troupe) active.
 1929 – Dem I. Dobrescu becomes mayor.
 1930 – Italian Church built.
 1931 – Scînteia newspaper begins publication.
 1933
 Grivița Strike of 1933.
 Bucharest Telephone Palace built.
 1936
 Herăstrău Park opens.
 Arcul de Triumf erected on Kiseleff Road.
 Dimitrie Gusti National Village Museum in Bucharest established.
 1937
 Scala Cinema opens.
 Royal Palace built.
 1938 – Cașin Church built.
 1940
 Political unrest.
 Germans in power.
 November: 1940 Vrancea earthquake.
 1941 – January: Legionnaires' rebellion and Bucharest pogrom.
 1944
 Bombing of Bucharest in World War II begins.
 31 August: City occupied by Russian forces.
 Geography Institute founded.
 1945 – Bombing of Bucharest in World War II ends.
 1946 – Textile school founded.
 1947 – City becomes capital of the newly formed Romanian People's Republic.
 1948
 Information Bureau of the Communist and Workers' Parties headquarters relocated to Bucharest from Belgrade, Yugoslavia.
 City streets renamed.
 FC Dinamo București founded.
 Population: 886,110; metro 1,041,807.
 1952 – Băneasa Airport terminal opens.
 1953
 August: City hosts 4th World Festival of Youth and Students.
 National Stadium opens.
 1956
 Bucharest student movement.
 Casa Scînteii built.
 1958
 World Festival of Puppet Theatres held.
 George Enescu Festival of music begins.
 1959
 Basarab railway station built.
 500th anniversary of city founding.
 1964 – Population: 1,239,458 city; 1,372,130 urban agglomeration.
 1970 – Otopeni Airport terminal built.
 1971 – New St. Eleftherios Church consecrated.
 1976
 Unirea Shopping Center opens.
 Ion Dincă becomes mayor.
 1977
 March: 1977 Vrancea earthquake.
 Population: 1,807,044 city; 1,934,025 urban agglomeration.
 1979
 Bucharest Metro begins operating.
 Piața Unirii metro station opens.
 1981 – Republica metro station opens.
 1985
 Victory of Socialism Boulevard laid out.
 Palace of the People construction begins.
 1989
 December: Romanian Revolution.
 21 December: Ceaușescu's final speech takes place at Palace Square.
 22 December: Ceaușescu flees city.
 Adevărul newspaper in publication.
 1990
 April: Golaniad protest begins.
 June 1990 Mineriad protest.
 1993 – Basarab metro station opens.
 1994 – Coat of arms of Bucharest re-adopted.
 1996 – Victor Ciorbea becomes mayor.
 1997 – Palace of the Parliament built.
 2000
 Pavilion Unicredit (art centre) established.
 Traian Băsescu becomes mayor.
 Centre for Defence and Security Strategic Studies headquartered in city.

21st century

 2002
 Bamboo Club (nightclub) opens.
 Chamber of Commerce and Industry of Romania building constructed.
 2005
 Bucharest Biennale begins.
 Adriean Videanu becomes mayor.
 2007 – January: Romania becomes part of the European Union.
 2008
 Sorin Oprescu becomes mayor.
 April: City hosts NATO summit.
 1st Infantry Division (Romania) headquartered in Bucharest.
 2009 – City Gate Towers built.
 2010
 May: Economic protest.
 Nusco Tower built.
 2011
 Basarab Overpass opens.
 National Stadium rebuilt.
 Population: 1,883,425; metro 2,272,163.
 2012
 5 March: 2012 Bucharest hair salon shooting.
 2012 Romanian protests.
 National Library of Romania new building opens.
 2013
 Dinamo Polyvalent Hall (arena) opens.
 Floreasca City Center built.
 2015
 Colectiv nightclub fire kills at least 26 people; deadliest-ever nightclub fire in Romania and one of the deadliest incidents in the city and the country since the end of the anti-communist revolution in 1989.
 Bucharest Nine (B9) organization is established by the President of Romania Klaus Iohannis and the President of Poland Andrzej Duda on 4 November.

See also
 History of Bucharest
 List of mayors of Bucharest

References

This article incorporates information from the German Wikipedia and Romanian Wikipedia.

Bibliography

Published in 19th century

Published in 20th century

Published in 21st century

External links

 Map of Bucharest, 1980
 Europeana. Items related to Bucharest, various dates.

Bucharest

Bucharest
Bucharest